WUDS-LP is a Classic Top 40 formatted broadcast radio station licensed to Woodstock, Virginia and serving Woodstock and Edinburg in Virginia.  WUDS-LP is owned and operated by Massanutten Military Academy.

References

External links
Woods 94dot9 Online

2015 establishments in Virginia
Radio stations established in 2015
UDS-LP
UDS-LP